Canteleux is a former commune in the Pas-de-Calais department in the Hauts-de-France region of France. On 1 January 2019, it was merged into the commune Bonnières. Before, it was the least populous commune in the department.

Geography
It is located 23 miles (37 km) west of Arras on the D84E1, which forms part of the border with the Somme department.

Population

See also
Communes of the Pas-de-Calais department

References

Former communes of Pas-de-Calais